is a Japanese idol. She is a former member of AKB48's sister group NGT48 as a kenkyūsei and was the 2nd captain of the former Team NIII (pronounced N-Three).

Career 
On January 25, 2015, at the "AKB48 Request Hour Set List Best 1035 2015" concert, it was announced that AKB48 would form a new sister group under the name NGT48. Auditions to become a member would be starting in March. The auditions actually held place from April 5 until May 18 and on July 25 the first generation members were announced, one of them being Kato.

She was officially promoted from a Kenkyuusei (Research Student) to a member of NGT48 Team NIII (along with 13 other members) on January 10, 2016, which was the day of the NGT48 Theater Opening. On that day she was cast as the female lead for a television series adaptation of Higurashi When They Cry, which was premiered from May 20 on BS Sky PerfecTV!. She made her A-side participation debut for AKB48's 44th Single Tsubasa wa Iranai which was released on June 1, 2016.

Later that month, Kato was the first and only member of NGT48's first generation to rank in AKB48's annual  ranking 76th with 13,571 votes.

In December 2016, Kato was announced as one of the cast members for the TV drama "Tofu Pro-Wrestling," which premiered on TV Asahi on January 21, 2017. Her pseudonym in the show was "Baton Katomina." On September 7, 2017, she was also announced as a participant in "Tofu Pro-Wrestling, The REAL 2017 CLIMAX", a live wrestling event based on the drama. On January 17, 2018, she was once again listed as a participant for the follow-up event, "Tofu-Pro Wrestling, The REAL 2018 QUEENDOM," to be held on February 23, 2018.

Kato was part of NGT48's 1st Single Seishun Dokei which was released on April 12, 2017. She centered the B-Side Song on the track Kurayami Motomu with Moeka Takakura and was a part of the song Akigan Punk. She wa also part of the 2nd single "Sekai wa Doko Made Aozora na no ka?", which was released on December 6, 2017. Together with Ayuka Nakamura she also centered the B-side song Gikochinai Tsuugaku Densha on the Theater Edition.

On June 17, 2017, she improved her ranking in the 2017 Senbatsu Sousenkyou as she rose by a steady number to spot 71 (with 16,641 votes). During her speech, Kato thanked her fans for getting her this rank and said that she hopes she will gain many international fans.

During AKB48's annual Request Hour in 2018, her duet with Noe Yamada ranked 33rd, which made it the highest ranking song from NGT48's most recent stage show, "Hokori no Oka."

Following NGT48's 2019 scandal, on May 21, Kato was demoted to kenkyūsei after posting an Instagram story of Maho Yamaguchi's graduation with the caption, "I'm doing my nails over here. I wish someone would change the channel."

Discography

Singles with NGT48

Singles with AKB48

Albums with AKB48 
Thumbnail
 Dare ga Watashi wo Nakaseta?

Appearances

Stage Units 
NGT48 Team NIII 1st Stage "Party ga Hajimaru Yo"
 Skirt, Hirari
 Hoshi no Ondo
NGT48 Team NIII 2nd Stage "Pajama Drive"
 Temodemo no Namida
 Pajama Drive
NGT48 Team NIII 3rd Stage "Hokori no Oka"
 Gesuna Yume

TV Variety 
 AKBingo! (2016 - 2018)
 HKT48 vs. NGT48 Sashikita Gassen

Dramas 
 Higurashi When They Cry (2016) as Rena Ryuugu 
 Higurashi When They Cry Kai (2016) as Rena Ryuugu 
 Tofu Pro-Wrestling (2017) as herself/Baton Katomina

References 

1995 births
Japanese women singers
Living people
NGT48 members